Yosef Yitzchak (Joseph Isaac) Schneersohn (21 June 1880 – 28 January 1950) was an Orthodox rabbi and the sixth Rebbe (spiritual leader) of the Chabad Lubavitch Hasidic movement. He is also known as the Frierdiker Rebbe (Yiddish for "Previous Rebbe"), the Rebbe RaYYaTz, or the Rebbe Rayatz (an acronym for Rabbi Yosef Yitzchak). After many years of fighting to keep Orthodox Judaism alive from within the Soviet Union, he was forced to leave; he continued to conduct the struggle from Latvia, and then Poland, and eventually the United States, where he spent the last ten years of his life.

Early life 
Yosef Yitzchak Schneersohn was born in Lyubavichi, Mogilev Governorate, Russian Empire (present-day Smolensk Oblast, Russia), the only son of Sholom Dovber Schneersohn (the Rebbe Rashab), the fifth Rebbe of Chabad. He was appointed as his father's personal secretary at the age of 15; in that year, he represented his father in the conference of communal leaders in Kovno. The following year (1896), he participated in the Vilna Conference, where rabbis and community leaders discussed issues such as: genuine Jewish education; permission for Jewish children not to attend public school on Shabbat; and the creation of a united Jewish organization for the purpose of strengthening Judaism. He participated in this conference again in 1908.

On 13 Elul 5657 (1897), at the age of 17, he married his third cousin, Nechama Dina Schneersohn, daughter of Rabbi Avraham Schneerson of Chișinău, son of Rabbi Yisroel Noach of Nizhyn, son of Rabbi Menachem Mendel Schneersohn, the Tzemach Tzedek.

In 1898, he was appointed head of the Tomchei Temimim yeshiva network.

In 1901, with financial support from Yaakov and Eliezer Poliakoff he opened spinning and weaving mills in Dubrovno and Mahilyow and established a yeshiva in Bukhara.

As he matured, he campaigned for the rights of Jews by appearing before the Czarist authorities in Saint Petersburg and Moscow. During the Russo-Japanese War of 1904 he sought relief for Jewish conscripts in the Russian army by sending them kosher food and supplies in the Russian Far East. In 1905, he participated in organizing a fund to provide Passover needs for troops in the Far East.

With rising antisemitism and pogroms against Jews, in 1906 he traveled with other prominent rabbis to seek help from Western European governments, especially Germany and the Netherlands, and persuaded bankers there to use their influence to stop pogroms.

He was arrested four times between 1902 and 1911 by the Czarist police because of his activism, but was released each time.

Upon the death of his father, Rabbi Sholom Dovber Schneersohn ("Rashab"), in 1920, Schneerson became the sixth Rebbe of Chabad.

Battling the Bolsheviks 
Following the takeover of Russia by the Communists they created a special "Jewish affairs section" run by Jews, known as the Yevsektsiya, which instigated anti-religious activities meant to strip Orthodox Jews of their religious way of life. As rebbe of a Russia-based Jewish movement, Schneersohn was vehemently outspoken against the state atheism of the Communist regime and its goal of forcibly eradicating religion throughout the land. He purposely directed his followers to set up religious schools, going against the dictates of the Marxist-Leninist "dictatorship of the proletariat".

In 1921, he established a branch of Tomchei Temimim in Warsaw.

In 1924, he was forced by the Cheka (Russian secret police) to leave Rostov due to the Yevsektsiya's slander, and settled in Leningrad. In this time he labored to strengthen Torah observance through activities involving rabbis, Torah schools for children, yeshivot, shochtim, senior Torah-instructors and the opening of mikva'ot; he established a special committee to help manual workers be able to observe Shabbat. He established Agudas Chasidei Chabad in USA and Canada.

In 1927, he established a number of yeshivot in Bukhara.

He was primarily responsible for the maintenance of the now-clandestine Chabad yeshiva system, which had ten branches throughout Russia by this time. He was under continual surveillance by agents of the NKVD.

Imprisonment and release 
In 1927, he was arrested and imprisoned in the Bolshoy Dom in Leningrad. He was accused of counter-revolutionary activities, and sentenced to death. A worldwide storm of outrage and pressure from Western governments and the International Red Cross forced the communist regime to commute the death sentence and instead on 3 Tammuz it banished him to Kostroma for an original sentence of three years. Yekaterina Peshkova, a prominent Russian human rights activist, helped from inside as well. This was also commuted following political pressure from the outside, and he was finally allowed to leave Russia for Riga in Latvia, where he lived from 1928 until 1929.

Yosef Yitzchak's release from Soviet imprisonment is celebrated each year by the Chabad community.

After his release, Yosef Yitzchak went to the Holy Land where he saw holy gravesites, local yeshivas and Torah centers, and met with rabbis and community leaders from 7–22 August 1929, leaving just prior to the massacre by Arabs of nearly 70 Jews living in Hebron on 24 August.

1929: First visit to the United States 

Following his trip to the Holy Land, he turned his attention to the United States, arriving in Manhattan on 17 September 1929 (12 Elul 5689) on the French passenger liner France. Schneersohn was greeted by some 600 people, with security provided by over 100 New York City police officers. "May the Almighty bless this great country that has been a refuge for our Jewish people," he said at his arrival. The purpose of his visit was to assess the educational and religious state of American Jewry, and raise awareness of the plight of Soviet Jews. Hailed as "one of the greatest Jews of our age," he was honored at a 28 October banquet in Manhattan by Orthodox, Conservative and Reform Jewish leaders.

While in the United States, Schneersohn also traveled (among places other than New York) to Philadelphia, Baltimore, Detroit, Boston, and Chicago. On 10 July, he met President Herbert Hoover at the White House. As the Republican presidential candidate, Hoover had lobbied for his release. Lubavitch followers in America begged their Rebbe to leave Russia and stay in America, but Schneersohn declined, saying that America was an irreligious place where even rabbis shaved off their beards. He left the United States to return to Riga, Latvia, on 17 July 1930.

From 1934 until the early part of World War II, he lived in Warsaw, Poland.

1940: Settling in the United States 
Following Nazi Germany's attack against Poland in 1939, Schneersohn refused to leave Warsaw. The government of the United States of America, which was still neutral, used its diplomatic relations to convince Nazi Germany to rescue Schneersohn from the war zone in German-occupied Poland. He remained in the city during the bombardments and its capitulation to Nazi Germany. He gave the full support of his organizations to assist as many Jews as possible to flee the invading armies. With the intercession of the United States Department of State in Washington, DC and with the lobbying of many Jewish leaders, such as Jacob Rutstein, on behalf of the Rebbe (and, reputedly, also with the help of Admiral Wilhelm Canaris, the head of the Abwehr), he was finally granted diplomatic immunity and given safe passage to go via Berlin to Riga, Latvia (where the Rebbe was a citizen and which was still free) and then on to New York City, where he arrived on 19 March 1940. Major Ernst Bloch, a decorated German army officer of Jewish descent, was put in command of a group which included Sgt. Klaus Schenk, a half-Jew and Pvt. Johannes Hamburger, a quarter-Jew assigned to locate the Rebbe in Poland and escort him safely to freedom. They were a few of up to 150,000 Jews and people of Jewish descent who were classified as Mischlinge ("mixed-breeds", i.e., Germans with one or two Jewish grandparents) by the Nazi government, but served in the German armed forces during World War II. They wound up saving not only the Rebbe, but also over a dozen Hasidic Jews in the Rebbe's family or associated with him.

Working with the government and the contacts Schneersohn had with the US State Department, Chabad was able to save his son-in-law (and future successor) Menachem Mendel Schneerson from Vichy France in 1941 before the borders were closed down.
When Schneersohn came to America (he was the first major Chasidic leader to move permanently to the United States) two of his chassidim came to him, and said not to start up all the activities in which Lubavitch had engaged in Europe, because "America is different." To avoid disappointment, they advised him not even to try. Schneersohn wrote, "Out of my eyes came boiling tears", and undeterred, the next day he started the first Lubavitcher Yeshiva in America, declaring that "America is no different." In 1949, Schneersohn became a U.S. citizen.

Following Schneerson's escape from Nazi occupied Poland and his settlement in New York City, he issued a call for repentance, stating L'alter l'tshuva, l'alter l'geula ("speedy repentance brings a speedy redemption"). This campaign was opposed by rabbis Avraham Kalmanowitz and Aaron Kotler of the Vaad Hatzalah. In return, Schneersohn was critical of the efforts of rabbis Kalmanowitz and Kotler based on the suspicion that Kalmanowitz and Kotler were discriminating in their use of funds, placing their yeshivas before all else, and that the Mizrachi and Agudas Harabonim withdrew their support of the Vaad after they discovered this fact.

Launch of Lubavitch activities in the United States 
During the last decade of Rabbi Schneersohn's life, from 1940 to 1950, he settled in the Crown Heights section of Brooklyn in New York City. Rabbi Schneersohn was already physically weak and ill from his suffering at the hands of the Communists and the Nazis and from multiple health issues including multiple sclerosis,<ref></https://www.chabad.org/therebbe/article_cdo/aid/1104700/jewish/I-Have-Come-to-My-Garden.htm></ref> but he had a strong vision of rebuilding Orthodox Judaism in America, and he wanted his movement to spearhead it. To do so, he went on a building campaign to establish religious Jewish day schools and yeshivas for boys and girls, women and men. He established printing houses for the voluminous writings and publications of his movement, and started the process of spreading Jewish observance to the Jewish masses worldwide.

He began to teach publicly, and many came to seek out his teachings. He began gathering and sending out a small number of his newly trained rabbis to other cities - a trend later emulated and amplified by his son-in-law and successor, Rabbi Menachem Mendel Schneerson.

In 1948, he established a Lubavitch village in the Land of Israel known as Kfar Chabad near Tel Aviv, on the site of the de-populated Arab village of Al-Safiriyya.

He died in 1950, and was buried at Montefiore Cemetery in Queens, New York City. He had no sons, and his younger son-in-law, Rabbi Menachem Mendel Schneerson ("The Rebbe") succeeded him as Lubavitcher Rebbe, while the older son-in-law, Rabbi Shemaryahu Gurary continued to run the Chabad Yeshiva network Tomchei Temimim.

After Rabbi Schneersohn's passing, his gravesite, known as "the Ohel", became a central point of focus for his successor Rabbi Menachem Mendel Schneerson, who would visit it regularly for many hours of prayer, meditation, and supplication for Jews all over the world.

After his successor's passing and burial next to his father-in-law, philanthropist Joseph Gutnick of Melbourne, Australia, established the Ohel Chabad-Lubavitch Center on Francis Lewis Boulevard in Queens, which is located adjacent to the joint grave site.

Book collection 
During his life in Smolensk, Rabbi Schneersohn set up a collection of his family's religious books and writings. It includes texts dating back to the 16th century. After World War I, the Bolsheviks found part of the collection and moved it to the Russian State Library. Another part of the collection was confiscated by Soviet troops in Nazi Germany during World War II and moved to Russia's military archive. In 1994, seven books were loaned to the U.S. Library of Congress for 60 days through an inter-library exchange program.

The books were given to the Chabad-Lubavitch library which helped to prolong the use of the books twice, in 1995 and 1996, before they finally refused to return them to Russia in 2000. They proposed an exchange for the opportunity to keep the books indefinitely, but Russia refused. In 2004, the Chabad-Lubavitch filed a lawsuit against Russia, claiming the remaining books. In 2010, an American court granted their claim, which Russia ignored as invalid. In retaliation, in 2011 Russia put a ban on lending works to American museums. In 2014, Senior United States District Judge Royce C. Lamberth imposed fines of $50,000 a day for Russia refusing to return the Schneersohn collection of more than 12,000 books and 50,000 religious papers. Since Rabbi Schneersohn had no heirs, Russia claims the collection is a national treasure of the Russian people. This dispute is related to the deteriorating ties between Moscow and the U.S. over the ongoing 2014 Russian military intervention in Ukraine. A Russian court ruled that the Library of Congress should pay fines of $50,000 a day for refusing to return the books.

Published works

Hebrew and Yiddish 
Sefer Hamaamarim – 5680–5689, 8 vol.
Sefer Hamaamarim – 5692–5693.
Sefer Hamaamarim – 5696–5711, 15 vol.
Sefer Hamaamarim – Kuntresim, 3 vol.
Sefer Hamaamarim – Yiddish
Sefer Hasichot – 5680–5691, 2 vol.
Sefer Hasichot – 5696–5710, 8 vol.
Likkutei Dibburim, 4 vol.
Kuntres Torat Hachasidut
Kuntres Limud Hachasidut
Admur Hatzemach Tzedek U'Tenuat Hahaskalah
Kitzurim L'Biurei Hazohar
Sefer Hakitzurim – Shaarei Orah
Kitzurim L'Kuntres Hatefillah
Sefer Hazichronot, 2 vol.
Moreh Shiur B'Limudei Yom Yom – Chumash, Tehillim, Tanya
Seder Haselichot
Maamar V'Ha'ish Moshe Anav, 5698
Igrot Kodesh, 14 vol.
Klalei Chinuch veHaDracha

Hebrew translations 
Likkutei Dibburim, 5 vol.
Sefer Hasichot – 5700–5705, 3 vol.
Sefer Hazichronot, 2 vol.

English translations 
Lubavitcher Rabbi's Memoirs
The Tzemach Tzedek and the Haskala Movement
On Learning Chasidut
On the Teachings of Chasidut
Some Aspects of Chabad Chasidism
Chasidic Discourses, 2 vol.
Likkutei Dibburim, 6 vol.
The Principles of Education and Guidance
The Heroic Struggle
The Four Worlds
Creation and Redemption 
The Majestic Bride
Oneness in Creation
Touching a City’s Soul
Defiance and Devotion

CD/video 
America Is No Different

In film 
Rabbi Yosef Yitzchak's escape from Poland was the subject of a 2011 Israeli documentary film Ha'rabi Ve'hakatzin Ha'germani (The Chabad Rebbe and the German Officer).

See also 
 770 Eastern Parkway

References

External links 
Biography
The "Ohel" – Gravesite
Yud Shvat
Books in English
Memoirs
Video of Schneersohn arriving in America
Family Tree
Some of his published works in Hebrew
Who Was Rabbi Yosef Yitzchak Schneerson? by Dr. Henry Abramson
Life, Liberty & Lubavitch: The Philadelphia Visit of the Rebbe Rayatz

 
1880 births
1950 deaths
American Hasidic rabbis
Hasidic rabbis in Europe
Kabbalists
People from Orshansky Uyezd
People from Rudnyansky District, Smolensk Oblast
Philosophers of Judaism
Prisoners sentenced to death by the Soviet Union
Rebbes of Lubavitch
Russian Hasidic rabbis
Russian prisoners sentenced to death
Schneersohn family
Soviet emigrants to the United States
Soviet expellees
Soviet rabbis